Petaca is an unincorporated community located in Rio Arriba County, New Mexico, United States. Petaca has a post office with ZIP code 87554.

References

Unincorporated communities in Rio Arriba County, New Mexico
Unincorporated communities in New Mexico